Küssnacht am Rigi (official name since 2004: Küssnacht) is a village and a district and a municipality in the canton of Schwyz in Switzerland. The municipality consists of three villages Küssnacht, Immensee, and Merlischachen, the hamlet Haltikon, the industrial area Fänn, and the alp Seeboden. It is situated at the north shore of Lake Lucerne and at the south shore of Lake Zug below mount Rigi.

History 

Küssnacht is first mentioned around 840 as in Chussenacho though this is from an 11th Century copy of the original document.  In 1179 it was mentioned as Chussenacho.

In 1424 Küssnacht became a district of the Canton of Schwyz.

Its etymology comes from the German words Küss and Nacht, meaning Kiss and Night respectively.

According to the legend of Wilhelm Tell, the hero shot the Austrian bailiff Gessler at the Hohle Gasse near the Gesslerburg with his crossbow: 

On August 29, 1935, Queen Astrid of the Belgians was killed here in a road accident.
A memorial chapel ("Königin-Astrid-Kapelle") was built at the accident scene. On March 4, 1989, the chapel was demolished by youths, to be restored later that year.

The well known Klausjagen ("Nicholas chase") festival takes place in Küssnacht every year on the eve of St. Nicholas Day (December 5). The festival, attended by about 20,000 people, consists of a parade of around 1,000 participants, and lasts far into the night.

Geography

Of this area, about 55.8% is used for agricultural purposes, while 26.4% is forested. Of the rest of the land, 16.5% is settled (buildings or roads) and 1.3% is unproductive land.

Of the agricultural land,  is used for orchards and vineyards,  is fields and grasslands and  consists of alpine grazing areas. Rivers and lakes cover  in the municipality.

The municipality is at the foot the Rigi mountain between the Lake of Lucerne and Lake Zug.  It consists of the villages of Küssnacht, Immensee and Merlischachen as well as the hamlets of Haltikon and Seebodenalp.

It is the capital and only municipality of the district of Küssnacht.

Demographics
, 21.1% of the population are resident foreign nationals. In 2015 a small minority (642 or 5.2% of the population) was born in Germany. Over the last 5 years (2010-2015) the population has changed at a rate of 1.63%. The birth rate in the municipality, in 2015, was 10.4, while the death rate was 7.9 per thousand residents.

Most of the population speaks German (87.5%), with Albanian and Serbo-Croatian being each spoken by about 2.7% of the population.

, children and teenagers (0–19 years old) make up 19.6% of the population, while adults (20–64 years old) are 62.4% of the population and seniors (over 64 years old) make up 18.0%.  In 2015 there were 5,252 single residents, 5,620 people who were married or in a civil partnership, 570 widows or widowers and 981 divorced residents.

In 2015 there were 5,360 private households in Küssnacht with an average household size of 2.27 persons. In 2015 about 40.6% of all buildings in the municipality were single family homes, which is less than the percentage in the canton (50.4%) and much less than the percentage nationally (57.4%).  Of the 1,980 inhabited buildings in the municipality, in 2000, about 45.5% were single family homes and 32.0% were multiple family buildings.  Additionally, about 16.6% of the buildings were built before 1919, while 15.9% were built between 1991 and 2000.  In 2014 the rate of construction of new housing units per 1000 residents was 6.21.  The vacancy rate for the municipality, was 0.82%.

The historical population is given in the following chart:

Heritage sites of national significance
The Gesslerburg Castle and the Hohle Gasse with the Tell Chapel are listed as Swiss heritage sites of national significance.  The village of Küssnacht am Rigi and the hamlet of Merlischachen are part of the Inventory of Swiss Heritage Sites.

Politics
In the 2015 federal election the most popular party was the FDP with 32.9% of the vote.  The next three most popular parties were the SVP (29.9%), the CVP (20.6%) and the SP (11.0%).  In the federal election, a total of 4,700 votes were cast, and the voter turnout was 57.3%.  The 2015 election saw a large change in the voting when compared to 2011 with the percentage received for the FDP increasing from 24.2% to 32.9%.

In the 2007 election the most popular party was the SVP which received 36.3% of the vote.  The next three most popular parties were the CVP (25.6%), the FDP (21.6%) and the SPS (12.1%).

Education
In Küssnacht about 72.9% of the population (between age 25-64) have completed either non-mandatory upper secondary education or additional higher education (either university or a Fachhochschule).

Transportation
All three are located on the Lucerne–Immensee line. The ferry terminal at Küssnacht am Rigi (See) is a short distance from the Küssnacht am Rigi railway station and has service to multiple destinations on Lake Lucerne.

Economy
Küssnacht is classed as a regional business center.

, there were a total of 6,849 people employed in the municipality.  Of these, a total of 306 people worked in 114 businesses in the primary economic sector.  The secondary sector employed 2,659 workers in 191 separate businesses.  There were 31 small businesses with a total of 779 employees and 13 mid sized businesses with a total of 1,449 employees.  Finally, the tertiary sector provided 3,884 jobs in 821 businesses.  There were 64 small businesses with a total of 1,626 employees and two mid sized businesses with a total of 256 employees.

In 2015 a total of 6.2% of the population received social assistance.  In 2011 the unemployment rate in the municipality was 1.6%.

In 2015 local hotels had a total of 61,077 overnight stays, of which 55.6% were international visitors.

In 2015 the average cantonal, municipal and church tax rate in the municipality for a couple with two children making  was 3% while the rate for a single person making  was 9%. The canton has a slightly lower than average tax rate for those making  and one of the lowest for those making .

Religion
Of the rest of the population,  there are less than 5 individuals who belong to the Christian Catholic faith, there are 146 individuals (or about 1.36% of the population) who belong to the Eastern Orthodox Church, and there are 17 individuals (or about 0.16% of the population) who belong to another Christian church. There are less than 5 individuals who are Jewish, and 501 (or about 4.68% of the population) who are Islamic. There are 76 individuals (or about 0.71% of the population) who belong to another church (not listed on the census), 563 (or about 5.26% of the population) belong to no church, are agnostic or atheist, and 354 individuals (or about 3.31% of the population) did not answer the question.

Crime
In 2014 the crime rate, of the over 200 crimes listed in the Swiss Criminal Code (running from murder, robbery and assault to accepting bribes and election fraud), in Küssnacht was 33.6 per thousand residents.  This rate is only 52.0% of the average rate in the entire country.  During the same period, the rate of drug crimes was 6.5 per thousand residents, which is 65.7% of the national rate.  The rate of violations of immigration, visa and work permit laws was 2.8 per thousand residents, which is only 57.1% of the rate for the entire country.

Notable people
Hekuran Kryeziu (born 1993), professional footballer
César Ritz, hotelier

References

External links

Official webpage
Tourist webpage
Future plans of Küssnacht
Hohle Gasse
Klausjagen

 
Cities in Switzerland
Municipalities of the canton of Schwyz
Districts of the canton of Schwyz
Populated places on Lake Lucerne
Populated places on Lake Zug
Cultural property of national significance in the canton of Schwyz